Parkan is a series of video games that combine space flight and trade simulation with first-person shooter style game play. Namely it allows players to board ships. "Parkan" is the name of the spaceship, which means boomerang for its shape.
Parkan: The Imperial Chronicles - the first game of the series space simulator and first-person shooter
Parkan: Iron Strategy - a spin-off first-person shooter and real-time strategy and mecha
Parkan II - the newest game space simulator and first-person shooter

Development 
Parkan: The Imperial Chronicles was originally published in 1997. In 2016, Nikita released the game on the GOG.com platform.

See also 
Mass Effect
Precursors (video game)

References

External links 

 Game.EXE review

1997 video games
First-person shooters
First-person strategy video games
Science fiction video games
Space trading and combat simulators
Video games using procedural generation
Video games developed in Russia
Windows games
Windows-only games